Andy Russell and Empact Collaboration Platform partnered with the Executive Office of the Secretary-General of the United Nations to develop a collaborative platform for the Sustainable Development Goals and the 2030 Agenda for Sustainable Development and Climate Change. Secretary-General Ban Ki-Moon called for the launch of this collaborative platform to the world at the opening session of the General Assembly in September 2016.

Andy is passionate about using the power of tech and innovation to address the challenges facing humanity.

Early career and education
Andy created his first business at age 16. A precursor to social networking, the business generated enough profit to allow Andy to pay for his education at Cornell University where he received his BA in Abnormal Psychology. Upon graduating from Cornell in 1993, Andy joined Chemical Bank (JP Morgan Chase), as an investment banking analyst and later associate in the acquisition finance group under the mentorship of Jimmy Lee.

In 1996, Russell deferred enrollment at Kellogg University where he was to study marketing and opted for the entrepreneurial trek. At age 25, Russell co-founded MOOMBA, with investors such as Laurence Fishburne, Larry Gagosian, Oliver Stone, and Keith Barish. Once MOOMBA was up and running, Russell enrolled at Columbia Business School. In 1999, Russell earned his Masters in Business Administration (MBA) from Columbia Business School. He simultaneously sold MOOMBA, making money for 28 investors.

From 1999-2003, Russell launched the digital media investment practice for East River Ventures.

Pilot Group
In 2003, Russell became a founding partner in Bob Pittman's private equity firm, Pilot Group. The companies that Russell invested in, incubated or bought included Daily Candy (purchased for $2.3M, sold for $125M), Thrillist (incubated and exited for 25x return), Tasting Table (incubated), Idealbite (invested for majority control and exited in one year for 5x return), PureWow (incubated and sold to Gary Vaynerchuk), Zynga (first professional money, exited for 100x return), Betaworks (first professional investor), Business Insider (first investor), Sailthru (first investor, currently valued at $200M), RapLeaf and LiveRamp (first investor, exited for $300M), SpongeCell (first investor), AdRoll (first investor at $6M, currently valued at $500M), and Bounce Exchange (first investor, currently valued at $200M).

Trigger Media
In 2011, Russell founded Trigger Media, an operating company focused on launching transformational or disruptive digital, social, ad tech, and marketing tech businesses. Trigger’s investors and advisors include Bob Pittman, Conde Nast/Advance Publications, former MySpace president Jason Hirschhorn,  Paul Tudor Jones of Tudor Investments, former Daily Candy CEO Pete Sheinbaum, as well as Michael Kassan, former president of Initiative Media Worldwide and CEO of MediaLink (recently sold for $270MM), Ken Fox, cofounder of Internet Capital Group, and OneKingsLane founder Ali Pincus,

Trigger Media launched InsideHook, a men's lifestyle website and email newsletter, in 2011 and Host Committee  in 2012.

Empact Collaboration Platform
Russell is the Founder and CEO of the Empact Collaboration Platform and endorsed by the United Nations Secretary General's office for donating the SaaS platform to the 2030 Agenda for Sustainable Development. Empact is also the engine behind AfricaConnekt.org, an online collaboration workplace for young African entrepreneurs to seek resources, mentorship and funding to support their sustainably-focused startup. This initiative is housed within the larger pan-African YouthConnect organization, launched in 2012 by Rwandan President Paul Kagame and now rolled out to 14 nations.

Russell is the Chairman Treat House. Russell sits on the board of DMA (Data and Marketing Association), Mt. Sinai Department of Child and Adolescent Psychiatry. Russell is also on the Advisory Council for the New York Stem Cell Research Foundation.

Press: Broadcasts
http://video.cnbc.com/gallery/?video=3000092258
http://video.cnbc.com/gallery/?video=3000199281
http://video.foxbusiness.com/v/3527719372001/reinventing-nyc-nightlife-through-social-media/
https://www.bloomberg.com/news/videos/b/bcf3e62c-3caa-4234-8019-088329dcaf17

Press: Print
http://www.nytimes.com/2012/11/29/fashion/andy-russell-bets-on-social-media-to-reinvent-night-life.html?_r=0
https://www.wsj.com/articles/build-taps-into-new-yorks-entrepreneurial-giving-base-1460935150
https://web.archive.org/web/20160919115218/http://scenemag.com/2014/02/invest-andy-russell/
http://www.businessinsider.com/bob-pittmans-former-partner-andy-russell-launches-his-first-of-many-startups-inside-hook-2012-3

Press: Philanthropy
https://www.wsj.com/articles/robin-hood-foundation-looks-to-engage-the-next-generation-1431562585
https://nypost.com/2015/05/13/star-studded-robin-hood-foundation-galas-raise-101m/
https://www.wsj.com/articles/build-taps-into-new-yorks-entrepreneurial-giving-base-1460935150
https://nypost.com/2016/04/13/tech-titans-bring-specialized-classes-to-inner-city-schools/

References

https://web.archive.org/web/20120418085059/http://finance.fortune.cnn.com/tag/andy-russell/
http://www.nypost.com/p/news/business/si_digital_dollars_creating_conde_eEvFkHDet5pePyAz35oDaO
http://venturebeat.com/2010/06/02/geekchicdaily-recruits-famous-geeks-bob-pittman-and-andrew-russell-as-investors/
http://www.betabeat.com/2011/09/20/can-you-feel-the-froth-zynga-and-business-insider-investor-launches-trigger-media-group-another-nyc-seed-stage-fund/
http://triggermedia.com/team.html
http://triggermedia.com/advisory_board.html
http://www.businessinsider.com/bob-pittmans-former-partner-andy-russell-launches-his-first-of-many-startups-inside-hook-2012-3
Forbes.com
http://www.businesswire.com/news/home/20110407005173/en/Andrew-Russell-Appointed-Bluefly-Board-Directors
http://adage.com/article/digital/insidehook-a-thrillist-older-guys-raises-1-7-million-hires-daily-candy-vet-ceo/239828/
http://www.sfgate.com/style/article/InsideHook-daily-e-mail-for-men-4775549.php
https://www.wsj.com/articles/SB10000872396390444464304577537371386577882
http://nypost.com/2012/02/27/inside-hook-e-targets-successful-men-in-their-40s/
http://www.nytimes.com/2012/11/29/fashion/andy-russell-bets-on-social-media-to-reinvent-night-life.html
http://nypost.com/2012/12/23/pecker-hosts-venture/
http://nypost.com/2013/03/07/at-new-nyc-nightclubs-the-dance-floor-rules/

Living people
American chief executives in the media industry
Cornell University alumni
Columbia Business School alumni
1971 births